Louis or Lou Jones may refer to:

Lou Jones (athlete) (1932–2006), American athlete
Louis B. Jones, American author and screenwriter
Louis Clayton Jones (1935–2006), African American international attorney and civil rights leader
Louis R. Jones (1895–1973), Marine Corps Major General during World War II
Lou Jones (rugby league) (1884–1924), Australian international rugby league footballer who played in the 1900s and 1910s
Lou Jones (photographer) (born 1945), American photographer
Louis (Blues Boy) Jones (1931–1984), American R&B singer
Louis Jones Jr., convicted murderer
Louis Jones (footballer) (born 1998), English football goalkeeper

See also 
Grandpa Jones (Louis Marshall Jones, 1913–1998), American musician
Lewis Jones (disambiguation)
Louise Jones (disambiguation)
Lois Jones (disambiguation)
Lovana Jones (1938–2006), American politician